Laddé is a surname. Notable people with the surname include:

M.H. Laddé (1866-1932), Dutch photographer and film director
Corrie Laddé (1915-1996), Dutch swimmer